Paul (Paolo) Sturzenegger (7 June 1902 – 19 May 1970) was a Swiss association football player who competed in the 1924 Summer Olympics. He was a member of the Swiss team, which won the silver medal in the football tournament. He scored five goals in the tournament.

References

External links
profile
 

1902 births
1970 deaths
Swiss men's footballers
Footballers at the 1924 Summer Olympics
Footballers at the 1928 Summer Olympics
Olympic footballers of Switzerland
Olympic silver medalists for Switzerland
Switzerland international footballers
Olympic medalists in football
FC Zürich players
FC Lugano players
Medalists at the 1924 Summer Olympics
Association football forwards
Sportspeople from Rosario, Santa Fe